Arhopala eumolphus, the green oakblue, is a lycaenid butterfly found in the Indomalayan realm. The species was first described by Pieter Cramer in 1780.

Range

The butterfly is mostly seen in India, ranging from West Bengal and Sikkim to Arunachal Pradesh, and is also found in Nepal, Bhutan, Bangladesh, and Myanmar.

Subspecies
A. e. eumolphus Sikkim, Assam, Myanmar, Thailand, Hainan
A. e. maxwelli (Distant, 1885) Mergui, Myanmar, southern Thailand, Peninsular Malaya, Sumatra, Borneo, Bangka
A. e. adonias (Hewitson, 1862) Java
A. e. caesarion Fruhstorfer, 1914 Sumatra
A. e. aristomachus Fruhstorfer, 1914 Palawan

External links

 With images.

Cited references

Arhopala
Fauna of Pakistan
Butterflies of Asia
Butterflies of Singapore
Taxa named by Pieter Cramer